2011 Empress's Cup Final was the 33rd final of the Empress's Cup competition. The final was played at National Stadium in Tokyo on January 1, 2012. INAC Kobe Leonessa won the championship.

Overview
INAC Kobe Leonessa won their second title by defeating Albirex Niigata – with Chiaki Minamiyama, Megumi Takase and Asuna Tanaka goal. This was the second consecutive win for INAC Kobe Leonessa.

Match details

See also
2011 Empress's Cup

References

Empress's Cup
2011 in Japanese women's football